Tuner (also capitalised as TUNER) is an electronic rock duo formed by drummer/programmer Pat Mastelotto (of King Crimson) and touch guitarist Markus Reuter. Tuner has released four albums and also functions as a production team, having produced and arranged records for Tovah, Moonbound and Chrysta Bell and as remixers (having contributed to Steven Wilson's Insurgentes Rmxs). Mastelotto and Reuter also work together in Stick Men and The Crimson ProjeKct.

History

Since 1994, Pat Mastelotto has drummed with King Crimson and several of its related ProjeKCts, as well as TU (with his former King Crimson bandmate Trey Gunn) and the Austin-based MastiKa. Markus Reuter also had King Crimson connections, having been a former student of Robert Fripp's Guitar Craft and subsequently gone on to work with the Craft-inspired Europa String Choir. By the mid-2000s, however, he was better known as a solo performer and for his work with centrozoon.

Mastelotto and Reuter had been friends since meeting on a train and falling into conversation. Despite their common interests and contexts, their initial relationship was social rather than musical and it was only several years later that Mastelotto invited Reuter to create music with him.

Tuner have gone on to release four albums – the studio recordings Pole and Totem and the live recordings Müüt and ZWAR.

Musical style

Tuner's music is best classified as experimental art-rock with a strong element of textural looping. The two performers create a dense, layered sound. Reuter has described their music as "overlapping and independently shifting rhythmic patterns combined with beautiful melodies" and as featuring ideas which can be "permutated endlessly." He has also described the band's work as "a vehicle for the things (which he and Mastelotto) always wanted to do, but never had a chance to."

Although Tuner's music has sometimes been compared to the improvisational approach which Mastelotto followed with the ProjeKCts, Reuter has described the band's initial musical approach as having been a reaction against free improvisation and jamming, and more focussed on composition, although improvisation has been reintroduced into Tuner's music. Tuner live performances feature a heavy degree of live sampling technology to supplement pre-prepared parts and improvised playing.

Personnel

Pat Mastelotto – acoustic & electronic drums & percussion, programming, loops & processing, vocals
Markus Reuter – U8 Touch Guitar, Warr Guitar, loops & processing

Discography

TOTEM (Unsung Records, 2005, remaster 2008)
POLE (Unsung Records, 2007)
MÜÜT (Unsung Records, 2008)
ZWAR (Unsung Records, 2010)
FACE (as Pat Mastelotto & Markus Reuter, Tempus Fugit, 2017)

as producers

Tovah - Escapologist (Lola Lounge, 2008), 
Moonbound - Peak Of Eternal Light (Unsung Records, 2011) 
Chrysta Bell - Strange Darling (unreleased, 2011)

as remixers

Steven Wilson - Insurgentes Rmxs (Kscope, 2009),

References

External links
Tuner homepage

Ambient music groups
Electronic music duos
Experimental musical groups
Musical groups established in 2005